Politics of American Samoa takes place in a framework of a presidential representative democratic dependency, whereby the governor is the head of government, and of a pluriform multi-party system. American Samoa is an unincorporated and unorganized territory of the United States, administered by the Office of Insular Affairs, U.S. Department of the Interior. Its constitution was ratified in 1966 and came into effect in 1967. Executive power is discharged by the governor and the lieutenant governor. Legislative power is vested in the two chambers of the legislature. The party system is based on the United States party system. The judiciary is independent of the executive and the legislature.

The  and the  take place at all levels of the Samoan body politic, from the family, to the village, to the region, to national matters. The majority of lands in American Samoa and independent Samoa are communal. A  can represent a small family group or a great extended family that reaches across islands, and to both American Samoa and independent Samoa.

Government

The government of American Samoa is defined under the Constitution of American Samoa. The secretary promulgated the Constitution of American Samoa which was approved by a constitutional convention of the people of American Samoa and a majority of the voters of American Samoa voting at the 1966 election, and came into effect in 1967.

The governor of American Samoa is the head of government and along with the lieutenant governor of American Samoa is elected on the same ticket by popular vote for four-year terms.

The legislative power is vested in the American Samoa Fono, which has two chambers. The House of Representatives has 21 members serving two-year terms, being 20 representatives popularly elected from various districts and one non-voting delegate from Swains Island elected in a public meeting. The Senate has 18 members, elected for four-year terms by and from the chiefs of the islands.

The judiciary of American Samoa is composed of the High Court of American Samoa, a District Court, and village courts. The High Court is led by a chief justice and an associate justice, appointed by the secretary of the interior. Other judges are appointed by the governor upon the recommendation of the chief justice and confirmed by the Senate.

Elections

International organization participation

 United Nations Economic and Social Commission for Asia and the Pacific (associate)
 Interpol (subbureau)
 International Olympic Committee
 Pacific Community

See also
Political party strength in American Samoa
American Samoa's at-large congressional district

References